I'll Go to Bed at Noon (2004), is a book by author Gerard Woodward. It was shortlisted for Booker Prize (2004).

Set in the north London suburb of Palmers Green in the 1970s, the story opens with Colette Jones attending the funeral of her elder brother's wife, followed by her failed attempts to save him from excessive drinking. Colette tries to exile her talented pianist son from her home, but alcoholism destroys his life as well.

The title was inspired by the William Shakespeare play King Lear. "And I'll go to bed at noon" is the last line spoken by the Fool.

2004 novels
Novels set in London
Novels set in the 1970s
Palmers Green
Chatto & Windus books